Moviecam is a motion picture equipment company specializing in movie camera systems for 35 mm film.

History
Originally started in Vienna, Austria as an in-house project of Fritz Gabriel Bauer and Walter Kindler's Moviegroup film production company in the late 1960s, the amount of research and development needed to create a new and modern motion picture camera system from scratch led to the formal creation of Moviecam as an independent corporate entity in 1976. Although only three camera models (SuperAmerica, Compact, and SL) were produced in significant quantities for international usage, the high quality camera design, simplicity of usage compared to the contemporary models of Arri and Panavision, and integration of modern and pioneering camera features led to widespread usage in the film industry. Arri subsequently bought the company in the 1990s. At Arri, Bauer developed, together with Walter Trauninger and their camera development team, the Arricam System, which combined the basic movement and design of the Moviecam systems with the precision electronic parts and complement of camera accessories already designed by Arri.

Content
The Arricam cameras were released in 2000 and remain the flagship camera line of Arri's 35 mm products. Despite the fact that Moviecam cameras have not been manufactured for almost ten years, their quality and features have kept them in service to meet their consistent high demand by feature film shoots.

In 2010, Moviecam released a camera focusing tool called Moviecam EasyFocus, a high precision measuring system with safe laser, for crane shot usage, etc.

Products

Camera lines
Moviecam 1 (1976)
Moviecam 2 (1976)
Moviecam 3N (1980)
Moviecam Super/SuperAmerica (1984)
Moviecam Compact (1990)
Moviecam Superlight (1996)
Moviecam Compact MK2 (2004)

Accessories
Moviecam EasyFocus (2010)

References

External links
Official website of Moviecam EasyFocus

Austrian brands
Movie camera manufacturers